William Ross Cotter (July 18, 1926 – September 8, 1981) was a Democratic member of the United States House of Representatives from Connecticut.

He was born in Hartford, Connecticut and graduated from Trinity College in 1949.

In 1953, he was elected to the city's court of common council and from 1955 to 1957 served as an aide to Governor Abraham Ribicoff.

He then served as Connecticut's deputy insurance commissioner from 1957 to 1964 and as insurance commissioner from 1964 through 1970.

He was elected as a Democrat to the Ninety-second and to the five succeeding Congresses and served from January 3, 1971, until his death from pancreatic cancer in East Lyme, Connecticut on September 8, 1981. In 1982, the William R. Cotter Federal Building at Hartford was named in his honor.

See also
 List of United States Congress members who died in office (1950–99)

References

1926 births
1981 deaths
Trinity College (Connecticut) alumni
Connecticut city council members
Politicians from Hartford, Connecticut
Democratic Party members of the United States House of Representatives from Connecticut
Deaths from cancer in Connecticut
Deaths from pancreatic cancer
20th-century American politicians
State insurance commissioners of the United States
William R